Sun ’n Fun Aerospace Expo (officially styled SUN 'n FUN) is a nonprofit organization in Lakeland, Florida dedicated to the promotion of aviation education. It is best known for the annual week-long fly-in and airshow at Lakeland Linder International Airport in Lakeland, Florida, usually held during late March or early April.

Previously called the 'Sun ’n Fun International Fly-In and Expo, for 2020 the event was officially renamed the Sun ’n Fun Aerospace Expo in April 2019.

In addition to the fly-in, at one time Sun 'n Fun also operated the Florida Air Museum and supported the Central Florida Aerospace Academy—an aviation-focused career academy operated by the Polk County School Board as part of Kathleen High School. In October 2019 a reorganization made the fly-in part of the Aerospace Center for Excellence, a non-profit organization that was established in 2014 to provide young students with science, technology, engineering and mathematics (STEM) instruction.

History

The event was founded in 1974.

Other ventures 

The Florida Air Museum at Sun 'n Fun, is also located on the Sun 'n Fun campus at Lakeland Linder International Airport.

In April 2010 Sun 'n Fun received a US$7.5M grant from the Aviation Education Foundation for the new Central Florida Aerospace Academy building. The school is an existing aviation-oriented high school and career academy that is already located on the airport grounds. Completed in August 2011 it accommodates 500 high school students, increasing its current capacity of 175 students.

Notable events 

The first weekend fly-in, called Mid-Winter Sun 'n Fun, was held in January 1975 at the Lakeland Municipal Airport and was limited to pilots and Experimental Aircraft Association (EAA), SESAC and FSAACA members. A total of 1,980 guests and 365 aircraft were present. The following year the fly-in was expanded to a full week and the City of Lakeland approved a lease for the convention site to be moved to the southwest quadrant of the airport. The public was invited on a limited basis. The number of visiting aircraft more than tripled compared to the first year, with 1,200 aircraft including 200 homebuilts, 180 antiques, 260 classics, and 28 warbirds on site. Snow fell at the airport for the only time in show history to date during the 1977 show.

In 1992 The Sun 'n Fun Air Museum (now the Florida Air Museum) held its grand opening. In 1997 the Brazilian Air Force's Aerial Demonstration Squadron (known as the Smoke Squadron) was the featured act. In 2000 Airshow legend Bob Hoover performed the last flight of his Shrike Commander at the fly-in. Two years later Bobby Younkin debuted the world's first aerobatic Learjet. During the 2004 show Bruce Bohannon and his turbocharged Exxon Flyin' Tiger set four time to climb world records.

In 2011 on March 31, an EF1 tornado hit the grounds of the airshow, resulting in damage to 40-50 aircraft, along with display tents and exhibits. Fifteen people received minor injuries. The airshow continued the next day. The 2015 show featured the first US performance of the Breitling Jet Team. In 2017 the show featured the French Air Force Patrouille de France aerobatic team, making it the second appearance in the US (the first being at the Melbourne Air And Space Show on April 1–3) in more than 30 years. The team flew one show on April 4.

See also 
 EAA AirVenture Oshkosh

References

External links
 Official website
 

Lakeland, Florida
Recurring events established in 1974
Air shows in the United States
Tourist attractions in Polk County, Florida
Events in Florida
1974 establishments in Florida
Aviation in Florida
Aviation exhibitions